Daniel Christmas (born September 10, 1956) is a former Canadian Senator.

Christmas is from the Mi’kmaw First Nation of Membertou in Nova Scotia. As part of a group of community leaders, he helped turn Membertou from being nearly bankrupt into one of the most successful Canadian First Nations. Christmas is a former advisory services director for the Union of Nova Scotia Indians. On October 27, 2016, Christmas was named to the Senate by Prime Minister Justin Trudeau to sit as an independent. At the time of his appointment, he was an advisor to the Membertou First Nation.

References

External links

1956 births
Living people
21st-century Canadian politicians
21st-century First Nations people
Canadian senators from Nova Scotia
First Nations politicians
Independent Canadian senators
Independent Senators Group
Indigenous Canadian senators
Mi'kmaq people